Liqenat may refer to:

Leqinat, mountain in western Kosovo and eastern Montenegro.
Leqinat lake, a mountain lake in the Liqenat mountain, in western Kosovo.
Small Lićenat Lake, a small lake in the Liqenat mountain, in western Kosovo.